Combe is a small village and civil parish in the English county of Herefordshire.

References

Villages in Herefordshire